Ternopil (U209) is a Grisha-class anti-submarine corvette of the Ukrainian Navy, In March 2014 the ship was captured by the Russian forces during the Crimean crisis.

History 
Ternopil is the 1124ME project ship (NATO reporting name: Grisha V class, of the Soviet classification: Albatros-class ).

The Russian type designation is Small Anti-Submarine Ship. The Grisha-class anti-submarine ship is designed to search for and destroy enemy submarines found in coastal areas. They were equipped with a variety of ASW weapons and an SA-N-4 surface-to-air missile launcher. All were fitted with retractable fin stabilizers. The Grisha II class was built for the border guard.

The Grisha V-class ships were built between 1985 and 2002. They incorporated further modifications with a single 76 mm gun replacing the twin 57 mm guns. Thirty ships were built. About 28 ships remain in the Russian Navy. Two ships —  and Ternopil were built in Ukraine. Lutsk was launched on May 22, 1993, and Ternopil entered service on February 16, 2006, with the Ukrainian Navy.

Service

The corvette was laid down on April 23, 1991, at the Leninska Kuznya shipyard. The ship was launched on March 15, 2002. The corvette was moved  from Kyiv to Mykolaiv. The corvette was moved again to the port of Sevastopol for trials testing. On February 15, 2006, an act was signed adding the ship to Ukrainian Navy; and the Ukrainian naval flag was raised on the ship on February 16, 2006.

The first sea trip was the ship in late 2006 for NATO Mission Oriented Training/MОТ. The Ukrainian crew practiced tactical episodes between May 25 and July 2007 while Ternopil took part in the NATO Active Endeavour anti-terrorist operation.  	

Ternopil participated in Operation Active Endeavour regularly in 2008, 2009 and 2010.

On March 20, 2014, the ship was captured by Russian forces during the Russian annexation of the Crimea. The ship scheduled to be handed back to Ukraine in May 2014. As of August 6, 2014 it was not; Russia suspended the return Ukrainian Navy materials from Crimea to Ukraine proper ostensibly because Ukraine did not renew its unilaterally declared ceasefire on July 1, 2014 in the War in Donbass. In 2016 it was reported that pieces from the Ternopil were being used to repair Russia's Black Sea Fleet.

References

External links
 Photogallery of Ternopil

Corvettes of the Ukrainian Navy
Ships built at Kuznya na Rybalskomu
2002 ships
Annexation of Crimea by the Russian Federation
Vessels captured from the Ukrainian Navy
Ternopil
Ships involved in the Russo-Ukrainian War